WorkSafe is New Zealand's primary workplace health and safety regulator.

Over 550 staff based across New Zealand who are working to lift New Zealand's health and safety performance and support workers to return home healthy and safe.

WorkSafe's role
As the regulator of the workplace health and safety system, WorkSafe has three key roles:

Regulatory confidence
 Undertaking regulatory activity to provide confidence that New Zealand workplaces are appropriately managing health and safety
 Enabling New Zealand to have confidence in WorkSafe as the primary health and safety regulator 
 Supporting confidence in the effectiveness of the health and safety regulatory regime.
Harm prevention
 Targeting critical risks at all levels (sector and system-wide) using intelligence
 Delivering targeted interventions to address harm drivers (including workforce capability, worker engagement and effective governance)
 Influencing attitudes and behaviour to improve health and safety risk management. 
System leadership
 Leading, influencing and leveraging the health and safety system (including other regulators) to improve health and safety outcomes
 Promoting and supporting industry, organisation and worker leadership of health and safety
 Leading by example through WorkSafe's own good practices. 
WorkSafe works collaboratively with businesses, undertakings, workers and their representatives to embed and promote good workplace health and safety practices. Some of WorkSafe's functions include:
 Engaging with duty holders (e.g. businesses, undertakings and workers)
 Educating duty holders about their work health and safety responsibilities (e.g. through guidance)
 Enforcing health and safety law.
These responsibilities are defined in legislation, specifically by the Health and Safety at Work Act 2015.

Health and safety reforms 
WorkSafe is implementing the most significant reforms to workplace health and safety in more than 20 years. These ‘Working Safer’ reforms are the Government's response to the recommendations of the Independent Taskforce on Workplace Health and Safety, as articulated in Working Safer: A blueprint for health and safety at work. The social and economic cost of deaths, injuries and ill-health arising from work is estimated at $3.5 billion a year. However, the real toll is paid by the families, friends and co-workers of those who are killed, seriously injured or experience work-related ill-health.

WorkSafe's goal is to transform New Zealand's workplace health and safety performance and includes the Government's target to reduce workplace fatalities and serious injuries by 25% by 2020.

Other health and safety regulators 
Other government agencies are also designated to carry out health and safety regulatory functions for certain work. They are:

Maritime New Zealand for ships as workplaces and work aboard ships

Civil Aviation Authority (CAA) for work preparing aircraft for imminent flight and aircraft in operation.

Former names 
Occupational Safety and Health (OSH) was a name used for health and safety functions in the Department of Labour. The name was taken out of use in 2005.

See also
 Ministry of Business, Innovation and Employment: responsible for workplace health and safety strategy, policy, legislation and regulations.

References

External links
 The Ministry of Business, Innovation and Employment's homepage

New Zealand Crown agents
Medical and health organisations based in New Zealand
Occupational safety and health organizations